Jindřiška Řeháčková (born July 16, 1955) is a Czechoslovak sprint canoer who competed in the mid-1970s. She finished ninth in the K-2 500 m event at the 1976 Summer Olympics in Montreal.

References
Sports-reference.com profile

1955 births
Canoeists at the 1976 Summer Olympics
Czechoslovak female canoeists
Living people
Olympic canoeists of Czechoslovakia